Paul Kelly is an Australian public health physician, epidemiologist and public servant who is the Chief Medical Officer (CMO) of Australia, having served since 29 June 2020. He succeeded Brendan Murphy, who became the Secretary of the Department of Health.

Kelly is also the head of the Australian Health Protection Principal Committee and in that role an adviser to the National Cabinet of Australia created to respond to the COVID-19 pandemic.

In the past, Kelly assumed a leadership role in the FluCAN project, a national system used to track people hospitalised with influenza, which helps to determine the efficacy of the flu vaccine.

On 22 December 2020, Kelly was officially appointed to the role of Chief Medical Officer on a permanent basis, having previously served in an acting capacity.

In 2022, Kelly reportedly advised against instituting mandatory COVID-19 tests for travellers from China, though the advice was ignored in favor of adopting a policy more in-line with other countries around the world, including the United States, France, and the United Kingdom.

References

Living people
Year of birth missing (living people)
Australian epidemiologists
21st-century Australian medical doctors
21st-century Australian public servants
Australian health officials